Nicolas Dapero (born January 31, 1998) is an Argentine racing driver from Buenos Aires.

Dapero began karting in Argentina in 2012. By 2014 he had moved up to car racing in Argentina. In 2015, he joined Juncos Racing's driver development program and embarked on a testing program. In 2016 he raced in the Pro Mazda Championship with Juncos and finished fifth in points with one win, coming in the penultimate race of the season at Mazda Raceway Laguna Seca. In 2017 he competed in Indy Lights with Juncos Racing. This was announced after completing several Indy Lights test sessions with Juncos in late 2016. He finished 13th in the championship with a best finish of fifth on the oval at Gateway Motorsports Park.

Racing record

Career summary

American open–wheel racing results

Pro Mazda Championship

Indy Lights

References

External links

1998 births
Argentine racing drivers
Racing drivers from Buenos Aires
Indy Pro 2000 Championship drivers
Indy Lights drivers
Living people

Brazilian Formula Three Championship drivers
Juncos Hollinger Racing drivers